Selvyana Adrian-Sofyan (born 26 February 1951) is an Indonesian sport shooter. She competed in the 1984 and 1988 Summer Olympics.

References

1951 births
Living people
Shooters at the 1984 Summer Olympics
Shooters at the 1988 Summer Olympics
Indonesian female sport shooters
Olympic shooters of Indonesia
20th-century Indonesian women
21st-century Indonesian women